Reo Franklin Fortune (27 March 1903 – 25 November 1979) was a New Zealand-born social anthropologist. Originally trained as a psychologist, Fortune was a student of some of the major theorists of British and American social anthropology including Alfred Cort Haddon, Bronislaw Malinowski and Alfred Radcliffe-Brown. He lived an international life, holding various academic and government positions: in China, at Lingnan University from 1937 to 1939; in Toledo, Ohio, USA from 1940 to 1941; at the University of Toronto, from 1941 to 1943; in Burma, as government anthropologist, from 1946 to 1947; and finally, at Cambridge University in the United Kingdom from 1947 to 1971, as lecturer in social anthropology specialising in Melanesian language and culture.

He was first married to Margaret Mead in 1928, with whom he undertook field studies in New Guinea from 1931 to 1933.  They divorced in 1936. Fortune subsequently married Eileen Pope, also a New Zealander, in 1937.

Fortune provided significant insights into the consequences of matrilateral and patrilateral cross-cousin marriage in advance of work by Claude Levi-Strauss. He is also known for his contribution to mathematics with his study of Fortunate numbers in number theory.

The 2014 novel Euphoria by Lily King is a fictionalized account of the relationships between Fortune, Mead and Gregory Bateson in pre-WWII New Guinea.

Selected publications
1927, The Mind in Sleep. Kegan Paul.
1932, Sorcerers of Dobu. Routledge.
1932, Omaha Secret Societies. Columbia University Press.
1933, A note on some forms of kinship structure.  Oceania, 4(1), 1–9.
1935, Manus Religion, An ethnological study of the Manus natives of the Admiralty Islands. American Philosophical Press.
1942, Arapesh. American Ethnological Society Publication 19; 237 pages.

Photographs
Many of the easily accessible images of Fortune include his one-time wife Margaret Mead, who was known for her interest in photography as an ethnographic method.

The National Library of New Zealand (Te Puna Matauranga o Aotearoa) holds a large collection of family and fieldwork photos of Reo and Eileen Fortune's lives in China, North America, and England.

In 1959 and again in 1970–71, Fortune revisited Dobu, the island community he made famous in his 1932 book, The Sorcerers of Dobu.

References

Further reading
"Reo FORTUNE (1903–1979)." Canberra Anthropology, 3:105–108.
Abrahams, R. and H. Wardle. 2002. "Fortune's Last Theorem", Cambridge Anthropology 23:1, 60–2
Bashkow, Ira and Lise M. Dobrin. 2013. "Reo Fortune." In R. Jon McGee and Richard L. Warms (eds.), Theory in Social and Cultural Anthropology: An Encyclopedia, pp. 272–274. Sage Publications.
 Dobrin, Lise M. and Ira Bashkow. 2010. "The Truth in Anthropology Does Not Travel First Class: Reo Fortune's Fateful Encounter with Margaret Mead." In Regna Darnell and Frederic W. Gleach (eds.), Histories of Anthropology Annual, vol. 6, ed. 66–128. Lincoln, NE: University of Nebraska Press.
 Dobrin, Lise M. and Ira Bashkow. 2010. "'Arapesh Warfare': Reo Fortune's Veiled Critique of Margaret Mead's Sex and Temperament." American Anthropologist 112(3):370–383.
 Bashkow, Ira and Lise M. Dobrin. 2007. "The Historical Study of Ethnographic Fieldwork: Margaret Mead and Reo Fortune among the Mountain Arapesh." History of Anthropology Newsletter, vol. 34(1), pp. 9–16.
 Bashkow, Ira and Lise Dobrin, 2018. « Un Boasien inattendu : biographie de Reo Fortune, ethnographe culturaliste devenu un excentrique amer » in Bérose, encyclopédie internationale des histoires de l’anthropologie
 Dobrin, Lise M. and Ira Bashkow. 2006. "Pigs for Dance Songs: Reo Fortune's Empathetic Ethnography of the Arapesh Roads." In Regna Darnell and Frederic W. Gleach (eds.), Histories of Anthropology Annual, vol. 2, pp. 123–154. Lincoln, NE: University of Nebraska Press.
 Gray, Geoffrey. "Being honest to my science: Reo Fortune and JHP Murray, 1927–1930." The Australian Journal of Anthropology, vol. 10 (1), 1999, pp. 56–76.
 Lohman, Roger. 2009. "Dreams of Fortune: Reo Fortune's Psychological Theory of Cultural Ambivalence." Pacific Studies, vol. 32, nos. 2/3—June/September
 Roscoe, Paul. 2003. "Margaret Mead, Reo Fortune, and Mountain Arapesh Warfare." American Anthropologist 105(3):581–591.
 Thomas, Caroline. 2009. "Rediscovering Reo: Reflections on the life and anthropological career of Reo Franklin Fortune." Pacific Studies, vol. 32, nos. 2/3; June–September
 Thomas, Caroline. 2011. The Sorcerers' Apprentice: A life of Reo Franklin Fortune, Anthropologist. PhD thesis, University of Waikato.

External links 

 Resources related to research : BEROSE - International Encyclopaedia of the Histories of Anthropology. "Fortune, Reo (1903-1979)", Paris, 2018. (ISSN 2648-2770)

1903 births
1979 deaths
New Zealand anthropologists
Place of birth missing
Academics of the University of Cambridge
20th-century anthropologists